Atherandra is a genus of flowering plants belonging to the family Apocynaceae.

Its native range is Indo-China to Western Malesia.

Species:

Atherandra acutifolia

References

Apocynaceae
Apocynaceae genera
Taxa named by Joseph Decaisne